This is the results breakdown of the local elections held in the Basque Country on 10 June 1987. The following tables show detailed results in the autonomous community's most populous municipalities, sorted alphabetically.

Overall

City control
The following table lists party control in the most populous municipalities, including provincial capitals (shown in bold). Gains for a party are displayed with the cell's background shaded in that party's colour.

Municipalities

Barakaldo
Population: 114,094

Basauri
Population: 51,931

Bilbao
Population: 381,506

Donostia-San Sebastián
Population: 171,885

Getxo
Population: 77,856

Irún
Population: 54,043

Portugalete
Population: 57,794

Rentería
Population: 43,676

Santurtzi
Population: 52,502

Vitoria-Gasteiz
Population: 199,449

Juntas Generales

References

Basque Country
1987